The Minister for Indigenous Australians in the Government of Australia is a position which holds responsibility for affairs affecting Indigenous Australians. Previous ministers have held various other titles since the position was created in 1968, most recently Minister for Indigenous Affairs. Since 1 June 2022 it has been held by Linda Burney.

Current minister and role

Linda Burney was sworn in as part of the Albanese ministry on 1 June 2022, following the Australian federal election in 2022. She took over the role from Ken Wyatt, who was the first Indigenous Australian appointed to the role, and the first minister named as Minister for Indigenous Australians.

The role assumes responsibility for matters concerning Aboriginal and Torres Strait Islander people in Australia, and is responsible for the National Indigenous Australians Agency.

Portfolio
In the Government of Australia, the Minister administers the portfolio through the Department of the Prime Minister and Cabinet and a range of other government agencies, including:
 Office of Indigenous Policy Coordination (OIPC)
 Indigenous Coordination Centres
 Office of the Registrar of Indigenous Corporations (ORIC)
 Torres Strait Regional Authority (TSRA)
 Indigenous Land Corporation (ILC)
 Office of the Aboriginal Land Commissioner
 Anindilyakawa Land Council
 Central Land Council
 Northern Land Council
 Tiwi Land Council

List of Ministers for Indigenous Affairs

The following individuals have been appointed as Minister for Indigenous Affairs, or any precedent titles:

List of Ministers for Reconciliation

Notes
 Whitlam was one of a two-man ministry consisting of himself and Lance Barnard for two weeks until the full ministry was announced.

References

External links
 

Indigenous Australians
Australia